Dandakaranya is a historical region in India, mentioned in the Ramayana. It is identified with a territory roughly equivalent to the Bastar division in the Chhattisgarh state in the central-east part of India. Dandakaranya roughly translates from Sanskrit to "The Jungle (aranya) of Punishment (dandakas)."
The Balaghat district of Madhya Pradesh and Bhandara, Gondia and Gadchiroli districts of Maharashtra are part of the ancient region Dandakaranya.

Etymology
Dandaka-aranya, means the Dandak Forest, the abode of the demon Dandak. Dandaka is the name of a forest mentioned in the ancient Indian text Ramayana. It is also known as Dandakaranya, aranya being the Sanskrit word for "forest". It was the location of the Danda Kingdom, a stronghold of the Rakshasa tribes. It was state of the Lanka Kingdom under the reign of Ravana. Ravana's governor Khara ruled this province.

As a sacred land in Hinduism

Dandakaranya is considered sacred in Hinduism, as many accounts of the region describe ancient Hindu peoples and Hindu deities living together in refuge there. The Dandakaranya zone was the location of the turning point in the Ramayana, a famous Sanskrit epic. The plot for the divine objectives to uproot the rakshasa from the land was formulated here. According to the Ramayana, it was home to many deadly creatures and demons. It is described to have stretched from Narmada to The Godavari and Krishna Rivers according to Valmiki Ramayana. Rama, his wife Sita and his brother Lakshmana spent initial years of fourteen years as exiles traveling around the region.

See also
Danda Kingdom

References 

Places in the Ramayana
History of Chhattisgarh
Refugees in India
Ancient Indian forests
Forests of Odisha